Julia Urquidi Illanes (30 May 1926 – 10 March 2010) was a Bolivian writer.

Life
Urquidi was born in Cochabamba. She was famous as the first wife of Peruvian writer Mario Vargas Llosa (1955-1964) and also the namesake of one of his most famous novels, Aunt Julia and the Scriptwriter.

In 1983 she published her memories titled Lo que Varguitas no dijo.

She died in Santa Cruz de la Sierra, aged 83.

References

1926 births
2010 deaths
People from Cochabamba
Bolivian women writers
Vargas Llosa family